Elections to Moyle District Council were held on 20 May 1981 on the same day as the other Northern Irish local government elections. The election used three district electoral areas to elect a total of 16 councillors.

Election results

Note: "Votes" are the first preference votes.

Districts summary

|- class="unsortable" align="centre"
!rowspan=2 align="left"|Ward
! % 
!Cllrs
! % 
!Cllrs
! %
!Cllrs
! %
!Cllrs
!rowspan=2|TotalCllrs
|- class="unsortable" align="center"
!colspan=2 bgcolor="" | SDLP
!colspan=2 bgcolor="" | UUP
!colspan=2 bgcolor="" | DUP
!colspan=2 bgcolor="white"| Others
|-
|align="left"|Area A
|bgcolor="#99FF66"|56.0
|bgcolor="#99FF66"|3
|0.0
|0
|0.0
|0
|44.0
|1
|4
|-
|align="left"|Area B
|0.0
|0
|25.9
|3
|30.4
|2
|bgcolor="#0077FF"|43.7
|bgcolor="#0077FF"|3
|8
|-
|align="left"|Area C
|bgcolor="#99FF66"|42.2
|bgcolor="#99FF66"|2
|9.4
|1
|8.0
|0
|40.4
|1
|4
|-
|- class="unsortable" class="sortbottom" style="background:#C9C9C9"
|align="left"| Total
|28.4
|5
|13.5
|4
|15.1
|2
|43.0
|5
|16
|-
|}

Districts results

Area A

1977: 3 x Independent, 1 x SDLP
1981: 3 x SDLP, 1 x Independent
1977-1981 Change: SDLP (two seats) gain from Independent (two seats)

Area B

1977: 2 x UUP, 2 x DUP, 2 x Independent Unionist, 2 x Independent
1981: 3 x UUP, 2 x DUP, 2 x Independent Unionist, 1 x Independent
1977-1981 Change: UUP gain from Independent

Area C

1977: 2 x SDLP, 1 x UUP, 1 x Independent
1981: 2 x SDLP, 1 x UUP, 1 x Independent
1977-1981 Change: No change

References

Moyle District Council elections
Moyle